Concord is an independent creative rights company that develops, manages and acquires sound recordings, music publishing rights, theatrical performance rights and narrative content. It is a private company, funded by long-term institutional capital and members of Concord’s management team.

Concord holds rights to more than 1 million songs, composed works, plays, musicals and active recordings.

Headquartered in Nashville with additional offices in Los Angeles, New York City, London, Berlin, Melbourne and Miami and staff in Auckland, Sydney, Toronto and Tokyo, Concord’s repertoire is licensed in virtually every country and territory worldwide.

History 
Auto dealer and jazz enthusiast Carl Jefferson started the Concord Jazz record label in 1973. He sold the label to Alliance Entertainment in 1994. In 1999, film/television producer Norman Lear and entertainment executive Hal Gaba purchased the company (Concord Jazz and Concord Records) after Alliance filed for bankruptcy.

In 2004, Concord Records acquired Fantasy, Inc., owner of Prestige, Fantasy, Milestone, Riverside, Specialty, and the post-Atlantic Stax catalog. Concord then combined with Fantasy to form the Concord Music Group. Several label acquisitions and partnerships followed including Telarc (2005) and Rounder Records (2010).

In 2013, Concord Music Group was acquired by an investor group led by Wood Creek Capital Management and Sound Investors, LLC. Many of the same investors also owned a majority interest in independent music publisher Bicycle Music Company.

Concord Music Group merged with Bicycle Music in 2015 to become Concord Bicycle Music. As Concord Bicycle Music, the company acquired Razor & Tie, Vanguard Records, Sugar Hill Records, Wind-up Records, Fearless Records, and Musart Music Group including its Edimusa publishing arm (2016).

In 2017, Concord Bicycle Music purchased European-based publishing company Imagem Music Group. After acquiring two theatrical licensing companies, Tams-Witmark Music Library and Samuel French in 2018, the company formed its own Theatricals division.

The company changed its name to Concord in early 2019.

On April 26, 2021, Concord acquired Downtown's copyrights consisting of 145,000 owned and co-published copyrights for $300 million.

In late 2021, incoming interest prompted Concord majority owner, the Michigan State Retirement System, to consider a sale of its stake in the company. ”We got some very strong bids, and we passed on all of them,” commented current Concord CEO Scott Pascucci. Pascucci reported that Concord received several bids that were “extremely aggressive” but none that were “extraordinary plus.”

In September of 2022, Concord purchased the publishing and recorded music catalogues of Tony Banks, Phil Collins, and Mike Rutherford, as well as the publishing and recorded music catalogue from their years in the band Genesis. 

Concord successfully closed $1.8 billion of senior notes in December 2022, secured by a significant portion of its highly diversified catalogue of sound recordings and songs. It is the largest asset-backed securitization offering of music rights in the industry to date in terms of both size of issuance and number of assets (over one million copyrights). Proceeds from the issuance will be reinvested to support Concord’s continued growth in 2023 and beyond.

Divisions

Concord Music Publishing 
In 2017, when Concord purchased the Imagem Music Group, it tripled the size of its catalog bringing it to nearly 800,000 copyrights. The Imagem purchase also brought classical music publisher Boosey & Hawkes and The Rodgers & Hammerstein Organization into Concord Music Publishing. Concord’s publishing catalog now includes a vast array of popular music, classical music and many song and stage standards.

As of 2022, Concord Music Publishing’s active roster includes The 1975, Glen Ballard, Fiona Bevan,  BIA, Jason Robert Brown, Tofer Brown, Daft Punk, Davido, Chase + Status, Cautious Clay, Jacob Collier, Denzel Curry, James Earp, Noah Goldstein, Jasper Harris, Ruston Kelly, Tom Kitt, Hillary Lindsey, Duff McKagan, Lori McKenna, Josh Miller, Justin Parker,  Steve Reich, John Adams, Steve Robson, Mark Ronson, Anthony Rossomando, Biff Stannard, Varren Wade, Walshy Fire, Tion Wayne, Eric Whitacre, Oh Wonder and Yola.

Concord Music Publishing’s catalog of songwriters and composers includes Benny Blanco, Leonard Bernstein Sammy Cahn, Phil Collins, Willie Colón, Aaron Copland, John Fogerty, Marvin Hamlisch, Oscar Hammerstein II, Imagine Dragons, Iron Maiden, Robert Johnson, Cyndi Lauper, Jimmy Napes, Pink Floyd, Sergei Prokofiev, Trent Reznor, Richard Rodgers, Santigold, Joan Sebastian, Pete Seeger, Nikki Sixx, Igor Stravinsky and Ryan Tedder.

In January 2020, Concord acquired a stake in PULSE Music Group, a move into chart-focused A&R. Effective July 2020, Concord will administer the catalog and future signings for PULSE, an additional 10,000 songs. PULSE's current songwriter roster includes James Blake, Cordae, Trevor Daniel, El-P, Brent Faiyaz, FNZ, Tyler Johnson, Kehlani, Bonnie McKee, OG Parker, OZ, Rich The Kid, Starrah, Ty Dolla $ign, and YEBBA. The PULSE roster is credited with over 150 million units of recorded music sales, 10 billion streams and more than 250 Platinum and Gold RIAA certifications.

Concord Music Publishing has also launched the new, Nashville-based talent and creative development venture Hang Your Hat Music, in partnership with GRAMMY®, CMA and ACM awarded songwriter Hillary Lindsey.

In April 2021, Concord acquired the roster and catalogue of Downtown Music Publishing bringing its catalog to nearly 600,000 works.

In August 2022, Concord acquired Australian music publisher Native Tongue, effectively launching Concord Music Publishing ANZ.

Concord Label Group 
Concord Label Group is made up of the original Concord Music Group labels at the time of the Bicycle Music merger (wholly owned Concord/Rounder, Concord Jazz and Fantasy Records), with Easy Eye Sound and Loma Vista Recordings as Joint Ventures. This area of Concord's business also includes its KIDZ BOP brand and its Craft Recordings catalog division. In early 2019, the company opened an office in Miami for Craft Latino Recordings.

Craft represents the many labels for which these artists' originally recorded, including Sugar Hill, Vanguard, Musart, Savoy Jazz, Stax, Vee-Jay, Fania, Independiente and Varese Sarabande. Craft also represents the R.E.M. catalog originally released under Warner Bros. Records.

In September 2022, Concord acquired the assets of L.A. Reid's HitCo Entertainment.

Concord Records and Jazz 
 Keb' Mo'
 Tears For Fears
 The Record Company
 Esperanza Spalding
 The Offspring
 Boz Scaggs
 Kristin Chenoweth

Fantasy Records 
 James Taylor
 Nathaniel Rateliff & The Night Sweats
 Valerie June
 Allison Russell
 Lukas Nelson
 Tanya Tucker
 Steve Perry
 Tedeschi Trucks Band
 Seether
 Switchfoot

Fearless Records 
 I Prevail
 Pierce the Veil
 Ice Nine Kills
 Underøath
 IDKHow

Loma Vista Recordings 
 Ghost
 St. Vincent
 The Revivalists
 Denzel Curry
 Common
 KoRn
 Andrew Bird
 Robert Glasper

Rounder Records 
 Dawes
 I’m With Her
 Sarah Jarosz
 Amythyst Kiah
 Billy Strings
 Sierra Ferrell
 Samantha Fish
 Robert Plant & Alison Krauss

Craft Recordings 
 Thelonious Monk
 Jewel
 R.E.M.
 Otis Redding
 Creedence Clearwater Revival
 Vince Guaraldi
 Hans Zimmer
 Little Richard
 Traveling Wilburys
 Isaac Hayes
 Evanescence
 Natalie Cole
 Creed

Craft Latino Recordings 

 Antonio Aguilar
 Joan Sebastian

KIDZ BOP 
Concord’s KIDZ BOP label has sold 23 million albums, generated 8 billion streams, has a featured channel on Sirius XM and an international tour under its name.

Concord Theatricals 
Concord purchased theatrical licensing companies Tams-Witmark and Samuel French, and combining then with R&H Theatricals, launched its Theatrical division in 2018. Concord Theatricals services both creators and producers of musicals and plays with theatrical licensing, script publishing and cast recordings. It also develops, licenses, produces and invests in musicals and plays for production.

The professional and amateur theatrical licensing catalog includes Samuel French, R&H Theatricals and Tams-Witmark, representing the works of Rodgers & Hammerstein, Marvin Hamlisch, Irving Berlin, Rodgers & Hart, Cole Porter, George & Ira Gershwin, Jerome Kern, and Kurt Weill, and shows and songs by musical theater composers Lin-Manuel Miranda, Adam Guettel, Jason Robert Brown, Shaina Taub and Michael John LaChiusa.

Concord Theatricals also licenses hundreds of Broadway musicals including Wizard of Oz, A Chorus Line, Hello Dolly, Bye Bye Birdie, Dreamgirls, Hair, Gypsy, SIX, Spongebob The Musical and Hadestown.

Playwrights include August Wilson, Neil Simon, Tom Stoppard, Tennessee Williams, Dominique Morisseau, Anne Washburn, Mac Rogers, and Edward Albee.

Concord Theatricals also works with Andrew Lloyd Webber and the Really Useful Group to license the composer and his collaborators’ musicals, including Jesus Christ Superstar, School of Rock, Evita, Cats, and Joseph and the Amazing Technicolor Dreamcoat.

Concord Theatricals is a co-producer on the currently running Broadway shows Hadestown and the 2022 revival of Into The Woods for which Concord Theatricals/Craft Recordings released the cast album. The Into the Woods (2022 Broadway Cast Recording) won the GRAMMY Award for Best Music Theater Album on February 5, 2023.

Concord Originals 
In 2019, Concord formed a Film & Television Development and Production Department to oversee all long-form audio-visual content produced by both Concord and third-party companies. In 2021, the Company launched Concord Originals as its narrative content creation business that will focus on developing and producing stories anchored by Concord’s artists, music and  theatrical works. The division’s slate consists of feature films, series, documentaries and podcasts, including remakes and re-imaginings of properties from Concord’s iconic portfolio.

Concord Originals recently executive produced Billie, a documentary about Billie Holiday which premiered at Telluride Film Festival in 2019. The business is in development on several major screen projects based on iconic musicals by Rodgers & Hammerstein: a TV series reimagining of Oklahoma!, which Concord Originals is producing alongside Skydance TV, a remake of The King and I with Temple Hill at Paramount Pictures and a contemporary take on Flower Drum Song with Daniel Dae Kim’s 3AD and Janet Yang Productions. Additional announced projects include a scripted series centering the history-making label Fania with Sherry Marsh, Jorge Granier and Sergio Pizzolante, an elevated genre film inspired by the music of blues legend Robert Johnson and a scripted podcast that tells the story behind the classic Mexican ballad Peregrina with Prodigal Entertainment. Concord Originals has also partnered with Skydance and Jennifer Lopez’s Nuyorican Productions to develop a slate of original projects based on Concord’s catalog of theatrical works.

Investments 
Concord is a member company/investor in Techstars Music and has invested in a range of technology startups.

References 

Entertainment companies of the United States
Concord Music Group